Neeke Manasichaanu is a 2003 Indian Telugu-language romantic drama film directed by Surya Teja. It stars Srikanth and Charmi.

Cast 

 Srikanth as Vivek
 Charmi as Sridevi
Anvita
 L. B. Sriram as the riddle master
 Chandra Mohan as Chandram 
 Sunil as Sattibabu 
 Satyaranayana as Sridevi's grandfather
 Sarath Babu as Vivek's father
 Jayanti as Sridevi's grandmother
 Brahmanandam
 Ali
 Sivaji Raja
 Venu Madhav
 Sudha
 Rajesh
 M. S. Narayana

Production 
The film's director, Surya Teja, worked as an assistant under K. Raghavendra Rao in Pelli Sandadi, before directing this film.

Soundtrack 
The music is composed by Sri, who composes after a four year break. The lyrics are written by Sirivennela Seetharama Sastry (except where noted). The song "Mehbooba Mehbooba" is based on the song Dil ding-dong ding dole. The audio rights are owned by Supreme Music. 
"Tholichoope Edo Chitram Chesinda"
"Andi Andaka"
"Aakupachchani Siri"
"Maaghamasam Manchi Muhurtam Kudirinde Enchakka"
"Mehbooba Mehbooba" (lyrics by Bhuvana Chandra)

Reception 
A critic from Sify opined that "Director Surya Teja has done a neat job with Neeke Manasichaanu. The movie is hilarious with a routine story and is presented well". Gudipoodi Srihari of The Hindu wrote that "A BIT away from the usual comedy mode of films in which Srikanth plays lead, this film presents serious drama and leaves comedy for branded comedians". Jeevi of Idlebrain stated that "It's not a bad film and you may watch it once for the comedy". Mithun Verma of Full Hyderabad wrote that "The concept of the movie is pretty good, but the execution makes you wonder which planet the filmmakers hail from".

References 

2003 films
2003 romantic drama films
Indian romantic drama films
2000s Telugu-language films